Mariano Ángel Bosch (born Buenos Aires, 9 August 1962) is a former Argentine rugby union player and a current coach. He played as a hooker.

Bosch played for Olivos Rugby Club in the Nacional de Clubes.

He had 4 caps for Argentina, from 1991 to 1992, without scoring. He was called for the 1991 Rugby World Cup, playing in two games, one of them as a substitute.

Bosch, after ending his player career, became a coach. He was already the coach of Olivos.

References

External links

1962 births
Living people
Argentine rugby union players
Argentina international rugby union players
Argentine rugby union coaches
Rugby union hookers
Rugby union players from Buenos Aires